The Story of Paul is a 1975 French drama film written and directed by René Féret. The film follows a man named Paul, who is institutionalised after a suicide attempt. The film won the Prix Jean Vigo in 1975.

Cast 
 Paul Allio as Paul 
 Jean Benguigui as The Italian 
 Bernard Bloch as the harmonica man
 Gildas Bourdet as the intern
 Isabelle Caillard as Brigitte 
 Florence Camarroque as the psychologist
 Philippe Clévenot as the amnesiac man
 Jean-Louis Jacopin as Bertrand

References

External links 
 

1975 films
1975 drama films
1970s French-language films
French drama films
French black-and-white films
Films set in psychiatric hospitals
Films directed by René Féret
1970s French films